Burmeister is a surname of German origin.

In zoology "Burmeister" refers to:
 Ernst-Gerhard Burmeister, German entomologist
 Hermann Burmeister (1807–1892), German zoologist also in botany "Burmeist."

Other people named Burmeister include:
 Annelies Burmeister (1928–1988), German contralto
 Arnold Burmeister (1899–1988), German military commander
 Carl Christian Burmeister (1821–1898), Danish engineer, co-founder of Burmeister & Wain
 Christfried Burmeister (1898–1965), Estonian speedskater
 Danny Burmeister (born 1963), American football player
 Eileen Burmeister (born 1924), American baseball player
 Forrest Burmeister (born 1913), American football player
 Friedrich Burmeister (1888–1968), German politician
 Friedrich Burmeister (1890–1969), German geophysicist
 Jana Burmeister (born 1989), German football goalkeeper
 Joachim Burmeister (c 1566–1629), German poet and composer
 Judith Burmeister (born 1986), German singer
 Ken Burmeister (born 1947), American basketball coach
 Paul Burmeister (born 1971), American football commentator
 Richard Burmeister (1869–1944), German pianist and composer 
 Roy Burmeister (1906–?), Canadian ice hockey player
 Saskia Burmeister (born 1985), Australian actress

See also
 
 Burmester (disambiguation)